Babine River Corridor Provincial Park is a provincial park in British Columbia, Canada, located to the north of Hazelton.  The park was established by Order-in-Council in 1999 and is approximately 15,339 hectares in area.

References

Provincial parks of British Columbia
Skeena Country
Protected areas established in 1999
1999 establishments in British Columbia